Leslie Porter (5 May 1923 – November 2002) was an English professional footballer who played as a half-back in the Football League for York City, in non-League football for Redheugh Works and North Shields and was on the books of Newcastle United without making a league appearance.

References

1923 births
Footballers from Gateshead
2002 deaths
English footballers
Association football midfielders
Newcastle United F.C. players
York City F.C. players
North Shields F.C. players
English Football League players